Ahmed Issa (July 17, 1943 – 1983) was a middle distance runner who competed for Chad.

Issa was part of the two-man team that first ever represented Chad at the Summer Olympics when he competed at the 1964 Games held in Tokyo, he competed in the 800 metres, in the first round he came second behind the German Manfred Kinder, in the next round he finished 6th and so didn't qualify for the final. He was featured prominently in the official film of the Games – Tokyo Olympiad by Kon Ichikawa.

Four years later at the 1968 Summer Olympics in Mexico City Issa finished 4th in his heat in the 800 metres and failed to qualify. He would fare better in the 1500 metres, finishing 4th in the first round and qualifying for semi-finals, in which he finished 8th and failed to make the qualifying mark of the top six from his heat to qualify.

In-between his Olympic appearances, Issa came 3rd at the 1965 All-Africa Games in the 1500 metres.

References

External links
 

1943 births
1983 deaths
Athletes (track and field) at the 1964 Summer Olympics
Athletes (track and field) at the 1968 Summer Olympics
Olympic athletes of Chad
Place of birth missing
Chadian male middle-distance runners
African Games bronze medalists for Chad
African Games medalists in athletics (track and field)
Athletes (track and field) at the 1965 All-Africa Games